Quiz on Korea is a South Korean television game show organized as part of an annual international public diplomacy program by the Ministry of Foreign Affairs of the Republic of Korea and KBS television. The quiz tests participants general knowledge of Korea. Quiz on Korea aims to help spread Hallyu, the "Korean Wave".

Overview
Preliminary domestic rounds are held within selected countries and national winners receive an all-expenses-paid trip to Korea to represent their country in the final round in Korea. The representatives are taken on a week-long guided tour around Korea.  The final round is filmed at KBS studios in Seoul and broadcast on KBS as a special program for the Chuseok holidays, which generally fall in September or early October. It is also aired by KBS World for some 200 million people in 88 countries around the world to watch. Since its inception the grand prize for the overall winner has been a brand new Hyundai car.

Eligibility
Foreign nationals who speak Korean and/or English.
Individuals and his/her immediate families shall not be of Korean nationality or ethnicity.

Format
Three sudden-death multi-choice rounds are held, with the winner of each round progressing to a fourth and final round.

First Quiz on Korea
Twenty three countries were invited to participate to mark anniversaries of diplomatic relations.

The final was held on August 31, 2012, and was broadcast on KBS1 on September 30 during Chuseok.

The MCs were:
 Shin Dong-yup (신동엽), a comedian,
 Kim Hong Seong (김홍성), a KBS announcer,
 Sooyoung (최수영), a K-pop star from the girl group Girls' Generation.

Entertainment between rounds was provided by:
 KARA - "Pandora" 
 EXO-K - "Mama"

The overall winner of Quiz on Korea was Hulkar Erdonova, a student from Uzbekistan.

Second Quiz on Korea
Thirty countries participated.
The final of the second Quiz on Korea was held on August 31, 2013, and was broadcast on KBS 1 on September 19 during Chuseok.

The MCs were:
 Hui-jae Lee (이휘재), a comedian,
 Ga Aeran (가애란), a KBS announcer, and 
 Jae Kyung (재경), a K-pop star from the girl group Rainbow.

Entertainment between rounds was provided by:
 Crayon Pop - "Bar Bar Bar" (Hangul: 빠빠빠)
 B.A.P - "Badman"
 KARA - "Runaway"

The overall winner of the second Quiz on Korea was Michael Smith from New Zealand.

Third Quiz on Korea
Twenty-one countries participated.
The final of the third Quiz on Korea was held on September 5, 2014, and was broadcast on KBS 1 on September 9 during Chuseok.

References

External links
Official website
Summary of first Quiz on Korea (in Korean)
Newsclip of second Quiz on Korea
Promotional video of Quiz on Korea

South Korean game shows
Korean Broadcasting System original programming